Nuestra Belleza Baja California  Sur 2012, was held at the Balneario de Coromuel of La Paz, Baja California Sur on June 23, 2012. At the conclusion of the final night of competition Diana Castro from La Paz was crowned the winner. Castro was crowned by outgoing Nuestra Belleza Baja California Sur and Nuestra Belleza Internacional México 2012  Jessica García Formenti. Eight contestants competed for the title.

Results

Placements

Special awards

Judges
Mariano Ruang
Felipe Marcos
Gabriela Carvajal - Public Relations Coordinator at Televisa
Dr. Enrique Estrada
Ana Laura Corral - National Coordinator of Nuestra Belleza México
Oscar del Toro
Carla Estrada - TV Producer
Carlo Antonio Rico - TV Producer

Contestants

References

External links
Official Website

Baja California Sur, 2012
Nuestra Belleza, 2012
2012 in Mexico
June 2012 events in Mexico